Streptopain (Streptococcus peptidase A, streptococcal cysteine proteinase, Streptococcus protease) is an enzyme. This enzyme catalyses the following chemical reaction

 Preferential cleavage with hydrophobic residues at P2, P1 and P1'

This enzyme is isolated from the bacterium, group A Streptococcus.

References

External links 
 

EC 3.4.22
Streptococcal proteins